Fabrice Santoro won in the final of first edition of this tournament. He defeated Rik de Voest 7–5, 6–4.

Seeds

Draw

Final four

Top half

Bottom half

References
 Main Draw
 Qualifying Draw

Soweto Open - Singles
2009 Men's Singles